Wauneta may refer to the following places in the United States:

Wauneta, Colorado
Wauneta, Kansas
Wauneta, Nebraska